Transavia Denmark ApS, also known as Transavia.com Denmark or Transavia Denmark and trading as transavia.com, was a Danish based low-cost airline operating as a subsidiary of Transavia group. Its main base was at Copenhagen Airport. Transavia Denmark chiefly operated scheduled and charter services to leisure destinations. It was headquartered in Kastrup, Tårnby Municipality. Operations ceased in 2011, although those in the Netherlands and France continue.

History 
The airline began operations on 6 November 2008; Sterling Airlines had gone bankrupt in October 2008 and Transavia saw a good opportunity to start operations in Denmark because of this, and announced that it would start operations at short notice. 

Transavia Denmark started flights from Billund Airport under a Danish tour operator. It operated five routes from Billund. It also announced a larger base at Copenhagen Airport from which it operated ten routes. Ticket sales for the new low-cost airline started on 7 November 2008.

In September 2010, it was announced that Transavia Denmark would cease operations on 23 April 2011. From 1 November 2010 onwards the activities were gradually scaled down until the complete stop on 23 April 2011. The parent of Transavia Denmark, Air France-KLM, stated that the Danish part of Transavia had not met expectations.

Destinations
This is a list of airports to which Transavia Denmark flew (including seasonal destinations):

Austria
Innsbruck - Innsbruck Airport
Salzburg - Salzburg Airport
Denmark
Billund - Billund Airport
Copenhagen - Copenhagen Airport
France
Montpellier - Montpellier - Méditerranée Airport
Nice - Côte d'Azur Airport
Greece
Chania - Chania International Airport
Italy
Naples - Naples Airport
Pisa - Galileo Galilei Airport
Spain
Barcelona - Barcelona Airport
Las Palmas de Gran Canaria - Gran Canaria Airport
Málaga - Málaga Airport
Menorca - Menorca Airport
Palma de Mallorca - Son Sant Joan Airport
Tenerife - Reina Sofía Airport

Fleet 
The Transavia Denmark fleet consisted of the following aircraft as of November 2010:

In-flight services
Transavia.com offered the "Assortment on Board" buy on board service offering food and drinks for purchase.

See also
 Transavia
 Transavia France

References

External links

 Annual report 2008-2009
 Transavia.com
 Transavia.com (Denmark) fleet

Defunct airlines of Denmark
Airlines established in 2008
Airlines disestablished in 2011
Defunct European low-cost airlines
Air France–KLM
European Low Fares Airline Association
Danish companies established in 2008
2011 disestablishments in Denmark

fr:Transavia Airlines#Transavia Denmark
it:Transavia Airlines#Transavia Denmark